Nellore Rural (Assembly constituency) is a constituency of the Andhra Pradesh Legislative Assembly in India. It is one of 8 constituencies in the Nellore district of Andhra Pradesh.

As per the Delimitation Orders (2008), the constituency covers Nellore mandal (Part), Golla Kandukur, Sajjapuram, Vellanti, Kandamur, Upputur, South Mopur, Mogallapalem, Mattempadu, Amancherla, Mannavarappadu, Mulumudi, Devarapalem, Pottepalem, 
Akkacheruvupadu, Ogurupadu, Ambapuram, Donthali, Buja Buja Nellore (Rural), Kallurpalle (Rural), Kanuparthipadu, Allipuram (Rural), Gudipallipadu, Pedda, Cherukur, Chintareddipalem, Visavaviletipadu, Gundlapalem, Kakupalle-I, Kakupalle -II (Madaraja Gudur) and Penubarthi Villages. Nellore mandal (M+OG) (Part), Nellore (M) - Ward No.16 to 26, 29 and 30, Allipuram (OG) (Part) - Ward No.45, Kallurpalle (OG) (Part) - Ward No.46 
Buja Buja Nellore (OG) (Part) - Ward No.47, Nellore (Bit.1) (OG) - Ward No.48.

Overview
It is part of the Nellore Lok Sabha constituency along with another six Vidhan Sabha segments, namely, Kandukur, Kavali, Atmakur, Kovuru, Nellore City and Udayagiri in Nellore district.

Members of Legislative Assembly

Election results

Assembly Elections 2019

Assembly elections 2014

Assembly Elections 2009

See also
 List of constituencies of Andhra Pradesh 
Legislative Assembly

References

Assembly constituencies of Andhra Pradesh